Arthur Oliver (March 25, 1911 – June 1, 1944) was an American boxer who competed in the 1936 Summer Olympics. In 2016, the 1936 Olympic journey of the eighteen Black American athletes, including Oliver, was documented in the film Olympic Pride, American Prejudice.

He was born in Mississippi and died at the crossing in Robertsdale, southeast of Hammond, Indiana when the truck he was riding in collided with a passenger train.

In August 1935, while still an amateur he served as sparring partner for Joe Louis. In 1936 he represented Chicago at the Intercity Golden Gloves, which he won. In the same year Oliver attended the Olympics, where he was eliminated in the second round of the heavyweight class after losing his fight to Olle Tandberg.

References

External links

1911 births
1944 deaths
Boxers from Mississippi
Heavyweight boxers
Olympic boxers of the United States
Boxers at the 1936 Summer Olympics
Road incident deaths in Indiana
Railway accident deaths in the United States
American male boxers